Lexington Airport  is a public airport located one mile (1.6 km) north of Lexington in Morrow County, in the U.S. state of Oregon.

See also
Boardman Airport

External links
Morrow County Airport website

Airports in Morrow County, Oregon